The Oka Sho (in Japanese: 桜花賞), is a race for three-year-olds in the Saitama Urawa Horse Racing Association.

Race Details

The race is run on a dirt 1600 meter track. 

It has been held at many racetracks including Kawasaki,  Ohi, Funabashi and Urawa.

The race was originally held in April but is now run at the end of March.

Winners since 2015

Winners since 2015 include:

Past winners
Past winners include:

See also
 Horse racing in Japan
 List of Japanese flat horse races

References

Horse races in Japan